Khristo Zhelev (born 3 October 1947) is a Bulgarian rower. He competed in the men's quadruple sculls event at the 1976 Summer Olympics.

References

1947 births
Living people
Bulgarian male rowers
Olympic rowers of Bulgaria
Rowers at the 1976 Summer Olympics
Place of birth missing (living people)
World Rowing Championships medalists for Bulgaria